The  is an archaeological site containing the ruins of a large Jōmon period settlement located in what is now part of the city of Noshiro, Akita in the Tōhoku region of Japan. The site was designated a National Historic Site of Japan in 1981.

Overview
The Sugisawadai ruins are located on the north side of the Shinonome Plateau, at an altitude of about 35 meters in the lower Yonedai River area, near the Sea of Japan. It is a large village site centering on the first half of the Jōmon period and extends over an area of 35,000 square meters. As a result of excavation surveys by the Akita Prefectural Board of Education and the Noshiro City Board of Education since 2003, a number of remains were confirmed. These included the foundations of 44 pit dwellings, including 4 large oval longhouse-style dwellings with a length of up to 31 meters, and 109 flask-shaped pits (storage holes) for food storage.  Many of the flask-shaped storage holes were two meters deep, and some contained the remnants of discarded shells.  Of note was a polished stone ax from the early Jōmon period which was made of a type of stone found only in the Hidaka region of Hokkaido. Some stone fragments of the same type of rock were also found in the vicinity, leading to the speculation that the stone ax was made locally from raw materials obtained by trade with Hokkaido.

Other artifacts recovered included a stone sarcophagus and stone weights which were used with fishing nets, as well as numerous examples of Jōmon-period earthenware, including cylindrical pots with evidence that they were used for cooking.

During the Heian period, a portion of the site was occupied by a later village, and there is another extensive ruin from the Yayoi period, the Sugisawano ruins, located a short distance to the south, which are not part of the National Historic Site designation.

The site is located approximately a 30-minute walk from Kita-Noshiro Station on the JR East Gonō Line.

See also
List of Historic Sites of Japan (Akita)

References

External links
Noshiro city official site 

Jōmon period
History of Akita Prefecture
Noshiro, Akita
Archaeological sites in Japan
Historic Sites of Japan